Lord Augustus William Frederick Spencer Loftus,  (4 October 1817 – 7 March 1904), was a British diplomat and colonial administrator. He was Ambassador to Prussia from 1865 to 1868, to the North German Confederation from 1868 to 1871 and to the Russian Empire from 1871 to 1879 and Governor of New South Wales from 1879 to 1885.

Background
Loftus was born in Bristol, England, the fourth son of John Loftus, 2nd Marquess of Ely, by Anna Maria Dashwood, daughter of Sir Henry Dashwood, 3rd Baronet.

Career
Loftus entered the diplomatic service in 1837 as attaché at Berlin and was likewise attaché at Stuttgart in 1844. He was secretary to Sir Stratford Canning in 1848, and after serving as secretary of legation at Stuttgart (1852), and Berlin (1853), was envoy at Vienna (1858), Berlin (1860) and Munich (1862). 

He was subsequently Ambassador at Berlin from 1865 to 1868, to the North German Confederation from 1868 to 1871 and to Saint Petersburg from 1871 to 1879. 

He then served as Governor of New South Wales from 1879 to 1885. He was appointed a Knight Grand Cross of the Order of the Bath in 1866 and sworn of the Privy Council in 1868.

Family
Loftus married Emma Maria Greville, daughter of Vice-Admiral Henry Francis Greville, in 1845. They had three sons and two daughters. The town of Emmaville, New South Wales, was named after Emma in 1882. 

Lady Emma died in January 1902. Loftus survived her by two years and died in Surrey, England, in March 1904, aged 86.

References

Further reading
 
 Loftus, A. (1892). "The diplomatic reminiscences of Lord Augustus Loftus. 1837–1862"
 Loftus, A. (1894). "The diplomatic reminiscences of Lord Augustus Loftus. 1862–1879"

Governors of New South Wales
Members of the Privy Council of the United Kingdom
Knights Grand Cross of the Order of the Bath
Younger sons of marquesses
1817 births
1904 deaths
Ambassadors of the United Kingdom to Russia
Ambassadors of the United Kingdom to Prussia
Colony of New South Wales people
19th-century Australian politicians